Roger Henry Metzger (pronounced "Met-ZEE-ger", born October 10, 1947) is a former Major League Baseball shortstop who played most of this career for the Houston Astros (1971–1978). He also played for the Chicago Cubs (1970) and the San Francisco Giants (1978–1980). A light-hitting shortstop, he was known for his strong defense and good running speed. He retired at age 32 because of the after-effects of a hand injury.

Career 
Metzger graduated high school from Holy Cross of San Antonio and then attended St Edward's University. He was selected in the 1st round (16th overall) of the 1969 Major League Baseball draft by the Chicago Cubs, and he made his debut for them a year later.

Metzger won the 1973 Gold Glove Award at Shortstop. He led the National League in triples in 1971 (11) and 1973 (14). He led the National League in outs (528) in 1972.

On November 29, 1979, Metzger lost the tips of four fingers on his right hand (index to pinky) in an electric table-saw accident. He had been building a wooden playhouse for his children as a Christmas present. Metzger attempted a comeback for the 1980 season, but was released by the San Francisco Giants on August 10, 1980, after only hitting .074 in 28 games. Immediately after being released, he was re-signed by the Giants as a coach for the remainder of the season.

In 11 seasons Metzger played in 1,219 games and had 4,201 at bats, 453 runs, 972 hits, 101 doubles, 71 triples, five home runs, 254 RBI, 83 stolen bases, 355 walks, .231 batting average, .291 on-base percentage, .293 slugging percentage, 1,230 total bases, 90 sacrifice hits, 22 sacrifice flies and 34 intentional walks.

Personal life 
A graduate of St. Edward's University in 1970, the school retired his jersey in June 2005. He resides with his wife, Tamy Metzger in Brenham, Texas, and they have two sons – Roger Kurt Metzger and Ryan Evans Metzger.

See also

 Houston Astros award winners and league leaders
 List of Houston Astros team records
 List of Major League Baseball annual triples leaders
 St. Edward's University notable alumni

Notes

Sources
, or Retrosheet
Pelota Binaria (Venezuelan Winter League)

1947 births
Living people
Arizona Instructional League Cubs players
Arizona State Sun Devils baseball players
Baseball players from Texas
Cardenales de Lara players
American expatriate baseball players in Venezuela
Chicago Cubs players
Gold Glove Award winners
Houston Astros players
Major League Baseball shortstops
People from Fredericksburg, Texas
San Francisco Giants players
San Francisco Giants scouts
St. Edward's Hilltoppers baseball players
Tacoma Cubs players